Egil Kristiansen (born January 18, 1966) is a former Norwegian cross-country skier who competed from 1992 to 2001. He finished eighth in the 30 km event at the 1994 Winter Olympics in Lillehammer.

Kristiansen finished 39th in the 50 km event at the 1995 FIS Nordic World Ski Championships in Thunder Bay, Ontario. His best World Cup finish was sixth in a 10 km event in Italy in 1994.

Kristiansen's lone individual international victory was in a 15 km CISM event in the United States in 2001.

Cross-country skiing results
All results are sourced from the International Ski Federation (FIS).

Olympic Games

World Championships

World Cup

Season standings

Team podiums
 2 victories 
 5 podiums

References

External links

1966 births
Cross-country skiers at the 1994 Winter Olympics
Living people
Norwegian male cross-country skiers
Olympic cross-country skiers of Norway
Sportspeople from Lillehammer